Mikel Martins das Neves (born 28 May 1983) is a Spanish former professional footballer who played as a defensive midfielder.

Club career
A product of Athletic Bilbao's youth system, Martins was born in San Sebastián, Basque Country, and started his senior career with the club's farm and B teams. He spent nine of his first ten seasons as a professional in the Segunda División B, also representing RCD Espanyol B, CD Baza, CD Guijuelo, Benidorm CF and CD Mirandés, joining the latter in June 2010.

Martins started in 27 of his 35 appearances for Mirandés in 2011–12, as the Castile and León side reached Segunda División for the first time ever. He played his first match in the competition on 17 August 2012, coming on as a late substitute in a 0–1 home loss against SD Huesca. 

On 21 July 2015, Martins signed with Real Unión from Hércules CF. He retired at the age of 36, after one year with SD Amorebieta also in the third tier and his native region.

References

External links

1983 births
Living people
Spanish footballers
Footballers from San Sebastián
Association football midfielders
Segunda División players
Segunda División B players
Tercera División players
Antiguoko players
CD Basconia footballers
Bilbao Athletic footballers
Athletic Bilbao footballers
RCD Espanyol B footballers
CD Guijuelo footballers
Benidorm CF footballers
CD Mirandés footballers
Cádiz CF players
Hércules CF players
Real Unión footballers
SD Amorebieta footballers